This is a list of flag bearers who have represented American Samoa at the Olympics.

Flag bearers carry the national flag of their country at the opening ceremony of the Olympic Games.

See also
American Samoa at the Olympics

References

American Samoa at the Olympics
American Samoa
Olympic